Streptomyces tyrosinilyticus is a bacterium species from the genus of Streptomyces which has been isolated from river sediments from the South River in Jiaohe in the Jilin Province in China.

See also 
 List of Streptomyces species

References

Further reading

External links
Type strain of Streptomyces tyrosinilyticus at BacDive -  the Bacterial Diversity Metadatabase	

tyrosinilyticus
Jiaohe, Jilin
Bacteria described in 2015